The 2011–12 Lebanese Second Division is the current 78th season of the second-highest level of Soccer in Lebanon. This season  featured 14 Clubs divided into two sub-division groups.

Teams
This is list of the 14 teams is for the season

Group 1 
 Harakat al Shabab FC
 Hekmeh FC
 Al Egtmaaey Tripoli
 Al-Mawadda Tripoli FC
 Al-Nahda Bar Elias FC
 Salam Zgharta
 Al-Shabab Tripoli FC

Group 2
 Al-Ahli Nabatieh
 Al-Fajr Arabsalim
 Homenmen Beirut
 Al-Irshad
 Al Islah Al Bourj Al Shimaly
 Al Khoyol FC
 Shabab Al-Ghazieh

References

External links
For updated tables:  Salam Zgharta front page

Lebanese Second Division seasons
Leb
2011–12 in Lebanese football